Treevenge is a 2008 Canadian Christmas horror short film written and directed by Jason Eisener, and produced by Yer Dead Productions. Shooting started in November 2007, and ended in February 2008. Post-production was completed in June 2008. The film stars Jonathan Torrens, Sarah E. Dunsworth, Lex Gigeroff, and Molly Dunsworth. The theme song to the film Cannibal Holocaust is played during the opening title.

Synopsis
Treevenge depicts Christmas from the perspective of sentient Christmas trees. After being hacked down and shipped to homes, they are subject to "humiliation" by humans, who decorated them and make them stand in their living rooms. The Christmas trees have had enough, and go on to massacre and kill an entire town as part of their uprising.

Cast
 Jonathan Torrens as Jim Macmichael
 Sarah E. Dunsworth as Cadence Macmichael
 Lex Gigeroff as the tree lot boss
 Molly Dunsworth as Molly Carpenter
 John Dunsworth and Cory Bowles as tree voices
 Jason Eisener as a lumberjack

Awards and nomination
Audience Award for Best Short Film -- New York City Horror Film Festival
Audience Award for Best Short Film -- Toronto After Dark Film Festival
Audience Award for Best Short Film -- Fantasia Film Festival
Best Editing -- Atlantic Film Festival
Best Short Film -- Fantastic Fest Online
Audience Award for Best Short Film -- San Francisco Independent Film Festival
Best Short Film -- Rue Morgue Magazine
Honorable Mention -- Sundance Film Festival

External links

Treevenge at Yer Dead Production website

Canadian comedy horror films
Canadian Christmas comedy films
Canadian Christmas horror films
2008 horror films
2000s Christmas horror films
2000s comedy horror films
2008 films
2008 short films
Films about trees
Films directed by Jason Eisener
Films shot in Nova Scotia
2008 comedy films
Canadian horror short films
Canadian comedy short films
2000s Canadian films